Nadi al-Jam'iyya al-Islamiyya (in Arabic نادي الجمعية الإسلامية) is a Palestinian sports club  and football team based in Gaza, which is affiliated to Hamas.

References

Football clubs in the State of Palestine